Patuakhali Science and Technology University (PSTU) is a government-financed public university in Patuakhali, Bangladesh. PSTU has given affiliation to the Barisal Government Veterinary College as its constituent faculty. An outer campus is situated at Babuganj under Barishal district. This is the only science and technology university and first public university in Barisal division.

History
PSTU formally started functioning after promulgation of government gazette notification on 8 July 2000 with the campus of former Patuakhali Agricultural College as its nucleus. The university started with the Faculty of Agriculture offering four-year BSc Ag. (Hons.) degrees.

The Patuakhali Science and Technology University was developed at the private initiative of the local people through the establishment of a higher secondary institute in 1972 as a private college. It was then turned to Patuakhali Agricultural College under the affiliation of Bangladesh Agricultural University (BAU), Mymensingh in 1979 with the objective of producing agricultural graduates offering the BSc.Ag. (Hons.) degree.

The college was nationalised on 1 February 1985 and was placed under the administrative control of the Bangladesh Agricultural Research Institute (BARI), Ministry of Agriculture together with BAU affiliation.

The government of Bangladesh launched a project to establish a science and technology university where none existed. The project advocated the transformation of Patuakhali Agricultural College into the full-fledged Patuakhali Science and Technology University that came into being through a Parliamentary Act passed on 12 July 2001.

List of vice-chancellors 

 Prof. Swadesh Chandra Samanta ( 17 May 2021 – present )

Administration

Swadesh Chandra Samanta joined PSTU as Vice-Chancellor on 17 May 2021. Before joining as Vice-Chancellor, he was serving the Department of Agronomy of the Patuakhali Science and Technology University as professor and also as the Dean of Faculty of Agriculture of the same university.

Location
The PSTU campus is at Dumki Upazila under Patuakhali District.

It has a compact campus with halls of residence within walking distance of the academic building. The main campus occupies  including a  agricultural research farm. It has two campus. The main campus is located in Dumki Upazila under Patuakhali District and another is located in Babuganj Upazila under Barishal District.

With a view to establishing a Fisheries Faculty, it has a plan to acquire  of land at Kuakata, the southernmost tourist resort of Bangladesh. This faculty will conduct research on fish covering inland and marine fisheries.

Academic 

Faculty of Agriculture
 Agricultural Botany
 Agricultural Chemistry
 Agricultural Engineering
 Agricultural Extension and Rural Development
 Agroforestry
 Agronomy
 Animal Science
 Biotechnology and Genetic Engineering
 Entomology
 Genetics and Plant Breeding
 Horticulture
 Plant Pathology
 Soil Science
 Statistics

Faculty of Computer Science and Engineering
 Computer and Communication Engineering
 Computer Science and Information Technology
 Electrical and Electronics Engineering
 Mathematics
 Physics and Mechanical Engineering

Faculty of Business Administration
 Accounting and Information Systems
 Economics and Sociology
 Finance and Banking
 Language and Communication
 Management Studies
 Marketing

Faculty of Fisheries
 Aquaculture
 Fisheries Biology and Genetics
 Fisheries Management
 Fisheries Technology
 Marine Fisheries and Oceanography

Faculty of Animal Science and Veterinary Medicine
 Dairy Science
 Anatomy and Histology
 Animal Products and By-Products Technology
 Basic Science
 General Animal Science and Animal Nutrition
 Genetics and Animal Breeding
 Medicine Surgery and Obstetrics
 Microbiology and Public Health
 Pathology and Parasitology
 Physiology and Pharmacology
 Poultry Science

Faculty of Environmental Science and Disaster Management
 Disaster Resilience and Engineering
 Disaster Risk Management
 Emergency Management
 Environmental Science
 Geo Information Science and Earth Observation

Faculty of Nutrition and Food Science
 Biochemistry and Food Analysis
 Community Health and Hygiene
 Environmental Sanitation
 Food Microbiology
 Food Technology and Engineering
 Human Nutrition and Dietetics
 Post Harvest Technology and Marketing

Faculty of Law and Land Administration
 Law and Land Administration

Residential student halls
 Bangabandhu Sheikh Mujibur Rahman Hall
 Sher-e-Bangla Hall-1
 Sher-e-Bangla Hall-2
 M. Keramot Ali Hall
 Kobi Begum Sufia Kamal Hall
 Bangamata Sheikh Fazilatun Nesa Hall (Main Campus)
 Sheikh Fazilatun Nesa Mujib Hall (Babuganj Campus)
 Birshrestho Captain Mohiuddin Jahangir Hall (Babuganj Campus, Barisal)

References

External links

 University Grants Commission Bangladesh

Public universities of Bangladesh
Universities of science and technology in Bangladesh
Educational institutions established in 2000
Organisations based in Patuakhali
2000 establishments in Bangladesh